Reflections (A Retrospective) is the first greatest hits album by American R&B singer Mary J. Blige, released in Europe on December 1, 2006, and in the United States on December 12 by Geffen Records. The album hasn't been certified by the RIAA but has sold 900,000 (according to the December 2009 Billboard magazine issue) copies in the United States. The album has also sold an estimated 140,000 in the United Kingdom despite only reaching a peak of number forty—this was due to consistent sales of 40k+ over the Christmas weeks. As of May 25, 2008 worldwide sales are 1,381,376.

History
Reflections (A Retrospective) was originally scheduled for release in November 2005 with the title Reminisce... Until the Breakthrough before the decision was made by Blige and Geffen Records to delay the release in favor of the new studio album, The Breakthrough. New songs that were due to appear on Reminisce—"Be Without You", "One", "MJB da MVP", and "Can't Hide from Luv"—were all transferred to the new album and the release date for the greatest hits was rescheduled to the spring of 2006. However, due to the commercial success of The Breakthrough, the release of Reminisce never materialized. In October 2006, Geffen Records announced that the project would finally be released on December 4, 2006 in the UK and December 12, 2006 in the U.S., under the title of Reflections (A Retrospective).

New material
Although Reflections (A Retrospective) is a retrospective collection of songs, writer Bryan-Michael Cox, who co-wrote and produced Blige's record-breaking single "Be Without You", confirmed that the release would feature four new songs, which includes the single "We Ride (I See the Future)" as well as "Reflections (I Remember)", "You Know", and "King & Queen", a duet with John Legend. The new material was originally intended to be part of a repackaged version of The Breakthrough to be released towards late 2006, but was transferred to the greatest hits release instead.

Also, on the back cover of the album (UK/International editions), track #17: the hit single "One" with U2, although it says (Mary J. Blige and U2), it is actually a solo version with U2 singing the chorus. Blige also sings the first part of the song, originally sung by Bono. This solo version is exclusive to the album, the original version with U2 (Bono's vocals) is on The Breakthrough.

Critical reception

Robert Sandall, writing for The Telegraph, felt that the "18-track résumé of the career of the 21st century's first lady of soul intends to deviate from the greatest-hits formula is clear from the start. The first four tracks are brand new and as strong as any of the more familiar stuff to come." musicOMH editor Neil Jones found that "Blige is undoubtedly one of the fascinating figures of modern pop culture, so even though there's more than a suspicion of Christmas cash-in here, and omissions are made, Reflections (A Retrospective) amply represents every extreme of her ouvre. It's a mixed bag that more than anything else highlights the differences between commercial and artistic creation, and as hip hop continues to veer towards the former, provides a pretty relevant story."

AllMusic's senior editor Stephen Thomas Erlewine wrote that the album "remains a completely enjoyable (if not completely satisfying) listen", going on to say that "Unfortunately, Reflections (A Retrospective) is nowhere close to being that straightforward.  A mere handful of the top ten hits are included; while obvious picks [...] are present, a casual fan could rattle off just as many well-known songs that are not." Similarly, Sal Cinquemani from Slant Magazine noted that "the tracks previously unavailable on a Mary album make this a valuable purchase for diehard collectors, but it will be useless to more casual fans. The fact that Reflections might be one of the worst excuses for a greatest hits collection ever is a testament to the longevity and consistency of Mary's career."

Commercial performance
Reflections (A Retrospective) debuted at number nine on the Billboard 200 Albums Chart, selling about 171,000 units in its first week. In addition, it peaked at number two on the Top R&B/Hip-Hop Albums chart. In the United Kingdom, the album debuted and peaked at number forty only, but was certified silver by the British Phonographic Industry (BPI), for shipments of 60,000 copies.

Track listing

Charts

Weekly charts

Year-end charts

Certifications

Release history

References

External links

2006 greatest hits albums
Albums produced by Eric Hudson
Albums produced by Jimmy Jam and Terry Lewis
Mary J. Blige albums
Geffen Records compilation albums